Eriophyes vitis, also known as grape erineum mite or blister mite, is a mite species in the genus Eriophyes infecting grape leaves (Vitis vinifera). E. vitis has spread worldwide and has three distinct strains: a leaf-curling strain, a blister-causing strain, and a strain that stunts the growth of buds. It is a vector of grapevine pinot gris virus and grapevine inner necrosis virus.

This species is associated with the mite Tydeus eriophyes on grapevines in the vicinity of Grabouw, South Africa.

References

Eriophyidae
Animals described in 1857
Leaf diseases
Grape pests
Agricultural pest mites
Arthropods of South Africa